Sri Lanka's women's national rugby sevens team represents Sri Lanka in Rugby sevens at international level.

Tournament history

Hong Kong Women's Sevens 
Sri Lanka was invited to participate in the Hong Kong Women's Sevens held in March 2004. They finished fourth in their pool and ninth overall. In 2006, Sri Lanka finished ninth at the Hong Kong Sevens, losing in the Vase final to Hong Kong 26 - 5.
At the 2016 tournament, Sri Lanka finished fourth in its pool and tenth in the Bowl, final losing to Kenya 29 - 0.

Asian Women's Sevens Championship 
At the Asian Championship held in Doha, Qatar in April 2007. Sri Lanka was defeated in the Shield final, losing 19-5 to Uzbekistan. In 2008, the tournament was held in Hong Kong in October. Sri Lanka finished third in their pool and ninth in the tournament.
At the 2012 tournament in Pune, India, Sri Lanka finished third in its pool and ninth in the tournament, winning the Bowl final. The first leg of the 2013 Asian Women's Sevens Series was held in Chonburi, Thailand in September. Sri Lanka finished second in its pool and fifth in the tournament, winning the Plate final. The second leg was held in Pune, India in November. Sri Lanka finished fourth in its pool and seventh in the tournament.

In 2014, the first leg was held in Hong Kong in August. Sri Lanka finished fourth in its pool and fifth in the tournament, winning the Plate final. The second leg was held in Beijing, China in October. Sri Lanka finished third in its pool and sixth in the tournament, losing the Plate final.

2015

The first leg was held in Qingdao, China in September 2015. Sri Lanka finished fourth in its pool and eighth in the tournament. The second leg was held in Colombo, Sri Lanka in October 2015. Sri Lanka finished third in its pool and eighth in the tournament.

2016

The first leg was held in Korea in September. Sri Lanka did not compete. The second leg was held in Hong Kong in October 2016. Sri Lanka finished third in its pool and sixth in the tournament, losing the Plate final. The final leg was held in Colombo, Sri Lanka in October 2016. Sri Lanka finished third in its pool and sixth in the tournament, losing the Plate final.

Sri Lanka also competed at the 2019 Asia Rugby Women's Sevens Series and placed sixth overall.

Women's Sevens Olympic Qualifier 
The 2015 ARFU Women's Sevens Championships was an Olympic qualifying tournament. The first leg of the tournament was held in Hong Kong on 7–8 November 2015. Sri Lanka finished fifth after the pool matches and sixth in the tournament, losing the Bowl final. The second leg of the tournament was held in Tokyo, Japan on 28–29 November 2015. Sri Lanka finished fifth after the pool matches and in the tournament, winning the Bowl final. Sri Lanka finished equal fifth in the competition overall and failed to qualify for the 2016 Summer Olympics.

Records

Commonwealth Games

Team
Sri Lanka sevens squad to the 2022 Commonwealth Games.
Head coach: Saliya Kumara

References

Asian national women's rugby union teams
Rugby union in Sri Lanka
Sri Lanka national rugby union team
Women's national rugby sevens teams